Charles L. Brooks III is an American theoretical and computational biophysicist. He is the Cyrus Levinthal Distinguished University Professor of Chemistry and Biophysics, the Warner-Lambert/Park-Davis Professor of Chemistry, Professor of Biophysics and Chair of Biophysics at the University of Michigan.

Career and research
Born in Detroit, Michigan, Brooks co-authored Proteins: A Theoretical Perspective of Dynamics, Structure, and Thermodynamics  with 2013 Nobel Laureate in Chemistry, Martin Karplus, and B. Montgomery Pettitt. He has authored over 250 peer reviewed journal articles and is also an Editorial Board Member for the journals Molecular Simulation and Proteins. Since 2004, he has been the North American Editor for the Journal of Computational Chemistry.

Awards and honors
  Fellow of the Biophysical Society, 2016
  Gilda Loew Memorial Award of the International Society of Quantum Biology and Pharmacology (ISQBP), 2014
  Hans Neurath Award - The Protein Society, 2012
 Top 100 Chemists of 2000-2010 as identified by Thomson Reuters, 2011
 Purdue University Chemistry Alumni of the Year, 2010
 North American Editor of the Journal of Computational Chemistry, 2004
 Fellow of the American Association for the Advancement of Science, 2002
  Computerworld Smithsonian Award in Computational Science, 1997
 Alfred P. Sloan Foundation Fellow, 1992

References

Year of birth missing (living people)
Living people
Scientists from Detroit
American biophysicists
University of Michigan faculty
Computational chemists